Menschen im Sturm is a 1941 German film directed by Fritz Peter Buch. It was an anti-Serbian propaganda and part of a concerted propaganda push against Serbs, attempting to split them from the Croats.

Synopsis
Vera witnesses the persecution of ethnic Germans in Yugoslavia, which awakens her ethnic consciousness. Her cosmopolitan friend Alexander is arrested. Vera flirts with the Serbian commander to allow Volksdeutsche to escape to the border. When arrested, she proudly affirms that she helped her countrymen and, in an escape attempt, is shot, to die happy and heroic.

Cast
Olga Chekhova
Gustav Diessl
Hannelore Schroth
Siegfried Breuer
Josef Sieber
Heinz Welzel
Kurt Meisel

Production and release
The film was shot on locations in Hrvatsko Zagorje, then-Independent State of Croatia, in July 1941. Its Zagreb premiere was held on 21 March 1942.

Unusually, contemporary Viennese film magazine  classified the film as "forbidden for the youth".

Motifs
The film reprises many of the same motifs as Heimkehr, in an anti-Serbian rather than anti-Polish context.

A sympathetic Croat aids the Germans, stating that all Croats should be friendly, and is murdered by Serbs for it, reflecting a widespread cliche of the friendly Croat.

References

Bibliography

External links 

1941 films
Nazi World War II propaganda films
Films of Nazi Germany
1940s German-language films
German black-and-white films
Films shot in Croatia
Films set in Yugoslavia
1940s German films